Anne Meskanen is a Finnish diplomat. She is the Finnish Ambassador to Kabul, Afghanistan and has been in charge since 1 September 2015. The mission was closed in March 2017 when a terrorist attack took place nearby.

Meskanen has worked in Finland at the Ministry for Foreign Affairs' General Global Affairs Unit.

Biography
Meskanen earned a master's degree in political science from the University of Helsinki before working as a journalist and foreign correspondent for the Demari Newspaper.

References

Ambassadors of Finland to Afghanistan
Living people
Year of birth missing (living people)
Finnish women ambassadors
University of Helsinki alumni
Finnish women journalists
Finnish reporters and correspondents